The Veil of Twilight (originally called Skumringslandet) is a Norwegian film written and directed by Paul Magnus Lundø about the investigation of a mysterious serial-killer in a mountain village, set in Norway in the mid 14th century.

Cast
Leif Nygaard
Ewen Bremner
Kim Bodnia
Andreas Wilson
Jørgen Langhelle
Kristina Knaben Hennestad
Nils Utsi

References

External links

2014 films
Norwegian crime drama films
2010s Norwegian-language films